Cape Verde follows a policy of nonalignment and seeks cooperative relations with all friendly states. Angola, Brazil, the People's Republic of China, Cuba, France, Germany, Portugal, Senegal, Russia, South Korea and the United States maintain embassies in Praia.

Cape Verde is actively interested in foreign affairs, especially in Africa. It has bilateral relations with some Lusophone nations and holds membership in a number of international organizations. It also participates in most international conferences on economic and political issues.

Bilateral relations

Multilateral Relations

European Union

See also 
 List of diplomatic missions in Cape Verde
 List of diplomatic missions of Cape Verde
 International organization membership of Cape Verde
 International recognition of Cape Verde

References